Confidences of the Night (lit. "Wounded Love") is a Canadian drama film, directed by Jean Pierre Lefebvre and released in 1975. The film stars Louise Cuerrier as a lonely single woman who is spending her evening at home accompanied only by the voices of other people, such as a radio phone-in show and noise from the neighbours heard through the wall; the film's limited plot unfolds when she calls the radio show to talk about leaving her abusive ex-husband, only to then receive angry phone calls from him and his mother.

Cuerrier herself is the only cast member seen on screen in the film; the offscreen voices are provided by a cast including Gilles Proulx, Paule Baillargeon, Pierre Curzi, Frédérique Collin, Monique Mercure, Jean-Guy Moreau, Denise Morelle, Lise Demers and Guy Thauvette.

The film opened in theatres in October 1975. It was later screened out of competition at the 1976 Cannes Film Festival.

Critical response
For Cinema Canada, Connie Tadros wrote that "Nothing happens. Not even the camera moves much. Lefebvre is content to hold the image and to let the woman walk in and out of the frame as if her lassitude has affected the whole crew. She does her nails, bathes and listens. She is alone and defeated. The tabloid papers and the sensational hot-lines keep her company and create the sensation of excitement, of something unusual."

References

External links

1975 films
Canadian drama films
1970s French-language films
1975 drama films
Films directed by Jean Pierre Lefebvre
Films shot in Montreal
French-language Canadian films
1970s Canadian films